Alfredo Junior Rojas Pajuelo (born 1 May  1991) is a Peruvian footballer, who plays for Sport Huancayo in the Torneo Descentralizado. He mainly plays as a defensive midfielder. Rojas is an aggressive, hard tackling player.

Club career 
Alfredo Rojas developed as a youth player in the popular Peruvian academy Academia Cantolao.

In January 2011 he joined Alianza Atlético, which at the time was competing the top-flight. There Rojas made his Torneo Descentralizado league debut on 13 March 2011 in Round 5 of the 2011 season away to Cienciano. With Alianza Atlético already down two goals at the famous Inca Garcilaso de la Vega Stadium, he entered the match in the 57th minute for Josimar Atoche, but the match finished in a 4–0 win for Cienciano.

Then on 4 July 2011 Rojas joined Chiclayo club Juan Aurich.

Honours

Club
Juan Aurich
Torneo Descentralizado: 2011

References

External links 

1991 births
Living people
Sportspeople from Callao
Peruvian footballers
Alianza Atlético footballers
Juan Aurich footballers
Peruvian Primera División players
Association football midfielders